Sumner Township is one of seventeen townships in Kankakee County, Illinois, USA.  As of the 2010 census, its population was 910 and it contained 337 housing units.  It was formed as Union Township from part of Yellow Head Township on October 8, 1855; its name changed to Sumner Township on June 27, 1856.

Township Headquarters
Sumner Township erected a new garage and office in 2016. The new facility is located on 8000 E. Road, just north of the intersection at 9000 N. Road. The old facility was a white block building located in the village of Whitaker on 9000 N. Road.

Geography
The land in Sumner Township is predominantly flat, with the exception of a few select areas. The rich, dark prairie soils make the township valuable as farmland. Several small creeks run through the township and flow toward the Kankakee River.

Demographics

Water bodies
Many creeks run at a southwest direction toward the township. They provide drainage for the townships farmland and residences. Three of these creeks begin the Will Township, Sumner Township's neighbor to the north in Will County. These include the Marshall Slough, Rock Creek, and the Exline Slough. The Marshall Slough cuts through Sumner Township in the far northwest corner and quickly cuts into Manteno Township. Rock Creek also cuts quickly through the township before it cuts into Manteno Township a mile south of Sumner Township's northern border. The Exline Slough is the biggest creek in Sumner Township and runs all the way from County Line Road at the north edge of the township to 6000 N. Rd. In Section 30 the Canavan Slough, which starts a mile north of the town of Whitaker, joins up with the Exline Slough. Farr Creek begins a half mile south of the southern border of Sumner Township, in Section 32, before crossing the southern border. Tower Creek starts in the northeast quarter of the township and runs into Ganeer Township which is south of Sumner Township.

Infrastructure
  Illinois Route 1

Adjacent townships
 Will Township, Will County (north)
 Washington Township, Will County (northeast)
 Yellowhead Township (east)
 Momence Township (southeast)
 Ganeer Township (south)
 Bourbonnais Township (southwest)
 Manteno Township (west)

Government
The township is governed by an elected Town Board of a supervisor and four trustees.  The township also has an elected assessor, clerk, highway commissioner and supervisor.  The township office is located at 9315 North 8000 East Road, Grant Park, IL 60940.

Cemeteries
The township contains these two cemeteries: Heusing and Saint Paul Lutheran.

Political districts
 Illinois' 11th congressional district
 State House District 79
 State Senate District 40

School districts
 Grant Park Community Unit School District 6
 Manteno Community Unit School District 5

References
 
 United States Census Bureau 2007 TIGER/Line Shapefiles
 United States National Atlas

External links
 Kankankee County Official Site
 City-Data.com
 Illinois State Archives

Townships in Kankakee County, Illinois
1855 establishments in Illinois
Townships in Illinois